Changi East Depot is a future train depot in Changi East, Singapore. At , the at-grade depot will house 70 to 80 trains of the Cross Island line (CRL) fleet. The depot will be located along Aviation Park Road near the Changi Exhibition Centre. Other facilities of the depot include the Operations Control Centre (OCC) for the CRL. First announced in 2019, the depot is expected to be completed in 2030 along with the first stage of the CRL.

History
On 25 January 2019, Transport Minister Khaw Boon Wan announced that the  depot would serve the Cross Island Line (CRL). The depot was expected to be completed in 2029 along with CRL Phase 1. The depot was initially planned to be constructed underground, but will be constructed at-grade instead. The restrictions imposed on construction works due to the COVID-19 pandemic led to delays and the CRL1 completion date was pushed by one year to 2030.

Contract CR101 for the construction of Changi East Depot and its associated facilities was awarded to China Jingye Engineering Corporation Limited (Singapore Branch) at S$1.05 billion on 28 May 2021. Construction will begin in the second half of 2021, with a scheduled completion date of 2030. The ground would have to be strengthened before the commencement of construction works.

Details
The station will be built along Aviation Park Road near the Changi Exhibition Centre. Other facilities of the depot include stabling and maintenance equipment for the trains and the CRL Operation Control Centre.

References

Depots of the Mass Rapid Transit Singapore
Proposed public transport in Singapore